The 2009 Firestone Indy 300 was the final showdown of the 2009 IndyCar season. This  race took place on October 10, at the  Homestead-Miami Speedway in Homestead, Florida near Miami. The race was telecast by Versus. Scotland's Dario Franchitti benefitted from late pit-stops for rivals Scott Dixon and Ryan Briscoe to take his second IndyCar Series title by ten points. This race is also the fastest 300 mile oval race in IndyCar history owing to no caution flags.

Grid

Race 
All cars utilized Dallara chassis, Honda engines, and Firestone Firehawk tires

Caution flags: none

References

External links
 Official boxscore

Firestone Indy 300
Firestone Indy 300
Firestone Indy 300
Homestead–Miami Indy 300